Hugginstown (historically anglicised as Ballyhuggin) is a small village between Kilkenny and Waterford in the south of County Kilkenny, Ireland. Hugginstown is also related to Carrickshock GAA club, who play their home games in the village.

References

See also
List of towns and villages in Ireland 

Towns and villages in County Kilkenny